The Rough with the Smooth is a British television sitcom which aired on BBC One. After appearing in 1971 as an episode of the Comedy Playhouse, a single series of six episodes was broadcast in 1975. The plot revolves two writers, one from East London and the other an Old Etonian, who live and work together on a radio serial.  The serial, about a vicar running an urban church, is called "Concrete Pastures".

Cast

Recurring
 Tim Brooke-Taylor as Richard Woodville
 John Junkin as Harold King
 Richard Hurndall as  Mervyn Thackeray
 Jenny Till as Veronica
 Richard McNeff as  Policeman
 Michael Knowles as  Vicar

Single episodes
 Keith Skues as Radio actor
 Jonathan Cecil as George Robinson
 Allan Cuthbertson as The Salesman
 Robert Dorning as  Mr. Andrews
 Sheila Fearn as Sally Thackeray
 Cyd Hayman as  Leonie
 Reginald Marsh as Mr. Green
 Annette Andre as Irene Fellowes
 David Daker as Rudolph Culpepper
 Elaine Delmar as Marie
 Sue Lloyd as  The American girl
 Barry Cryer as Duggie Doogood
 Bernard Holley as  Supermarket Assistant
 Jenny McCracken as  Nina
 Alan Tilvern as  George
 John Cater as  Peter
 Jenny Logan as  Beryl
 Karin MacCarthy as  Anita
 Jacki Piper as Helen
 Pamela Manson as Mrs. Andrews
 Larry Martyn as Simpson
 Barbara New as  Mrs. Arbuthnot
 Christine Paul as Sammy
 Tina Martin as Lynda Andrews
 Ivor Salter as  Taxi driver
 Tim Barrett as Hallidays' salesman
 Cleo Sylvestre as Rosalie

References

Bibliography
 Christopher Perry. The British Television Pilot Episodes Research Guide 1936-2015. 2015.

External links
 

1971 British television series debuts
1975 British television series endings
1970s British comedy television series
BBC television sitcoms
English-language television shows